Charles L. Carson (November 3, 1847 – December 18, 1891), was an architect born in Baltimore, the oldest son of Daniel Carson, a builder, and one of the founders of the Baltimore chapter of AIA.  Carson had little formal training as an architect. Around 1870 he partnered with Thomas Dixon (architect) while taking drawing lessons at the Maryland Institute College of Art. Carson and Dixon worked from their offices at 117 Baltimore Street as Thomas Dixon and Charles L. Carson until sometime before 1877 when the partnership was dissolved.  In 1888 he hired Joseph Evans Sperry  who became his chief assistant, and later his partner and successor.

On Dec. 6, 1870, he was married to Annie F. Cornelius, the daughter of Richard Cornelius.  He lived at 1725 Madison Avenue in Baltimore at the time of his death, at age 44. A number of Carson's buildings were completed by Carson and Sperry after Carson's death.

A number of his works are listed on the U.S. National Register of Historic Places.

Selected works

 Wilmington Opera House, 818 N. Market St., Wilmington, Delaware NRHP-listed
 Mount Vernon Place United Methodist Church (church only) (1872)
 Enoch Pratt Free Library, Canton Branch, Baltimore (1886)
 Eutaw Savings Bank, later the Baltimore Grand, corner of Fayette and Calvert Streets, Baltimore (1887)
 Marburg Brothers Tobacco Warehouse, S. Charles St., Baltimore (demolished about 1990)

 The Strawbridge Methodist Episcopal Church, corner of Park Avenue and Wilson Street (1889)
 Baltimore Hebrew Congregation Synagogue, Baltimore (1890)
 Central Savings Bank, 1 E. Lexington St., Baltimore (1890)
 Strouse Brothers Company Building (Marlboro Square), 410 W. Lombard St, Baltimore (1890)
 Baltimore Masonic Temple, 223-225 N. Charles St., Baltimore (1893)
 Equitable Building, 10 N. Calvert St., Baltimore (1894)
 The Phoenix Club House, on Eutaw Place, Baltimore
 The Masonic Temple at 223-225 North Charles Street, Baltimore, MD.
 University of Tennessee Buildings, Knoxville, TN.
 Winchester Hotel, Winchester, VA.
 Church of the Epiphany, Washington, DC.
 Grace Methodist Episcopal Church, Wilmington, DE.  
 Central Presbyterian Church, Eutaw Place, Baltimore
 Lafayette Presbyterian Church, Lafayette Square, Baltimore
 Epworth Church, corner of Gilmore and Mosher streets, Baltimore
 Baltimore Grand, 401 W. Fayette St., Baltimore, Maryland (Carson, Charles L.), NRHP-listed
 Church of the Ascension, 1215 Massachusetts Ave. NW, Washington, D.C. (Carson, Charles), NRHP-listed
 Dorchester County Courthouse and Jail, 206 High St., Cambridge, Maryland (Carson, Charles L.), NRHP-listed
 James E. Hooper House, 100 E. 23rd St., Baltimore, Maryland (Carson, Charles L.), NRHP-listed
 One or more works in Cambridge Historic District, Wards I and III, roughly bounded by Glasgow, Glenburn, Poplar, Race, and Gay Sts. and the Choptank River, Cambridge, Maryland (Carson, Charles L.), NRHP-listed
 One or more works in Goucher College Historic District, Old (Boundary Increase), roughly bounded by W. 25th St., Guilford Ave., North Ave. and Howard St., Baltimore, Maryland (Carson, Charles), NRHP-listed

Carson was supervising architect for Stanford White's Lovely Lane Methodist Church (1884) and Goucher Hall (1888).

References

1847 births
1891 deaths
Architects from Baltimore
19th-century American architects